Prospect Mountain is a peak in the Sawtooth Mountains of northeastern Minnesota, in the U.S.  It is located between the west ends of Gunflint Lake and Loon Lake.,

Notes

Mountains of Minnesota